Mlakva may refer to:

 Mlakva, Kupres, a village in Bosnia and Herzegovina
 Mlakva, Perušić, a village in Croatia